Filmfare Awards refers to Filmfare Awards for Hindi-language film industry

Filmfare Awards may also refer to 
  
 Filmfare Awards South, Filmfare Awards for South Indian film industries
 Filmfare Marathi Awards, Filmfare Awards for Marathi-language film industry
 Filmfare Awards East, Filmfare Awards for East Indian film industries
 Filmfare Awards Punjabi, Filmfare Awards for Punjabi-language film industry
Filmfare OTT Awards